WWST (102.1 FM, "Star 102.1") is a radio station licensed to Sevierville, Tennessee, and serving the Knoxville market. The station is owned by SummitMedia. The station is a Top 40 (CHR) station that broadcasts with 15,000 watts of power and is known on-air as "Star 102.1, Your #1 Hit Music Station".

History
102.1 FM was known as WSEV-FM (co-owned with WSEV/930 in Sevierville) in its early years and was automated. On December 2, 1987, the station started playing a mix of adult contemporary and country music as "U-102". Eventually, the station started playing adult contemporary exclusively.

WMYU and WWST frequency swap
WMYU has been on the 102.1 frequency since 1985. They were known as U102 and listed in the Tennessee Football program as a station that carried the Vol Network football broadcast identified as WMYU Sevierville/Knoxville. They were also the official sponsoring station of Boomsday which takes place on Sunday night before Labor Day and started back in 1986. On that same date, sister station 93.1 FM changed to Star 93.1 FM with the call sign "WWST". On March 9, 2001, the two stations swapped frequencies moving the WWST call letters to 102.1 FM as Star 102.1 while the "WMYU" call letters were moved to 93.1 FM where they remained until late 2008.

Journal Communications and the E. W. Scripps Company announced on July 30, 2014 that the two companies would merge to create a new broadcast company under the E. W. Scripps Company name that owned the two companies' broadcast properties, including WWST. The transaction was completed in 2015, pending shareholder and regulatory approvals. Scripps exited radio in 2018; the Knoxville stations went to SummitMedia in a four-market, $47 million deal completed on November 1, 2018.

References

External links
star1021fm facebook
Star 102.1 official website

WST
Contemporary hit radio stations in the United States
Radio stations established in 1978
1978 establishments in Tennessee